The Call of the Wood is the debut album by Italian symphonic black metal band Opera IX, released through Miscarriage Records in 1995. It would be re-released by Avantgarde Records in 2001, with two bonus tracks.

In 2009, the album was completely remastered and once more reissued, this time through Peaceville Records, retaining the two bonus tracks from the 2001 re-release.

Track listing

Personnel
Opera IX
 Cadaveria (Raffaella Rivarolo) — vocals
 Ossian D'Ambrosio — guitars
 Vlad — bass
 Flegias, a.k.a. Marcelo Santos (Alberto Gaggiotti) — drums

Guest musicians
 Silent Bard — keyboards

References

1995 debut albums
Opera IX albums
Avantgarde Music albums
Peaceville Records albums